Port Cornwall, also known as Fort Cornwall, is a former village in northern Alberta, Canada within the Municipal District of Lesser Slave River No. 124. Prior to incorporation as a village, the community was known as Mirror Landing.

Port Cornwall was located on the north shore of the Lesser Slave River at its confluence with the Athabasca River.

History 
In the late 19th century, Mirror Landing was a stopping point along a trail for travellers to the Peace Country from Fort Edmonton via Athabasca Landing. By 1911, Mirror Landing was one of numerous stopping points for unimpeded steamboat travel between Athabasca Landing and Lesser Slave Lake.

The community was incorporated as the Village of Fort Cornwall on October 27, 1913, although it was referred to as Port Cornwall as early as January 1914. According to Alberta Municipal Affairs, Port Cornwall had a population of 200 in 1913.

By early 1914, the village had over 30 businesses and numerous residences.  Infrastructure included streetlights and sidewalks. It also included a government telegraph office and quarters for the Royal North-West Mounted Police. At this time, plans were also underway for the building of a school and a Methodist church.

However, early 1914 would also spell the beginning of the end for the village. The Edmonton, Dunvegan and British Columbia Railway had reached the present location of Smith, across the confluence of the Lesser Slave and Athabasca rivers from Port Cornwall. Subdivision of the Smith townsite began as a result, and Port Cornwall's demise began.

Ultimately, the Village of Port Cornwall later disorganized on September 11, 1917.

See also 
List of communities in Alberta
List of former urban municipalities in Alberta
List of ghost towns in Alberta

References

External links 
View of Port Cornwall, 1914 – Library and Archives Canada

Municipal District of Lesser Slave River No. 124
Former villages in Alberta
Ghost towns in Alberta